Edward Rose (1849–1904) was an English playwright

Edward Rose may refer to:

 Edward Everett Rose (1862–1939), American playwright
 Edward Rose (cricketer) (born 1936), cricketer for Cambridge University
 Edward P.F. Rose, English palaeontologist and geologist
 Edward Rose (fur trapper) (died 1833)